Pelegrín Horacio Castillo Semán (born April 22, 1956, San Francisco de Macorís, Dominican Republic) is a Dominican politician. He was the first to be Minister of Energy and Mines of the Dominican Republic; he has been in office since April 2014. He was elected deputy in 2010 for a period of 6 years, but in 2014 he resigned to take over as Minister of Energy and Mines. In 2012, he was candidate for the presidential election of that year in the Dominican Republic. He also ran for president in the presidential elections of 2016.

References 

Living people
1956 births
People from San Francisco de Macorís
Dominica politicians
Government ministers of Dominica
White Dominicans